David Byrd may refer to:

 David Edward Byrd (born 1941), American graphic artist
 David Harold Byrd (1900–1986), Texan producer of petroleum
 David Byrd (politician) (born 1957), Tennessee politician